Warekena (Guarequena), or more precisely Warekena of Xié, is an Arawakan language of Brazil and of Maroa Municipality in Venezuela, spoken near the Guainia River. It is one of several languages which go by the generic name Baré and Baniwa/Baniva – in this case, distinguished as Baniva de Maroa or Baniva de Guainía.

According to Aikhenvald (1999), there are maybe 10 speakers in Brazil and about 200 in Venezuela.

Kaufman (1994) classified it in a Warekena group of Western Nawiki Upper Amazonian, Aikhenvald (1999) in Eastern Nawiki.

Personal pronouns in Warekena are formed by adding an emphatic suffix -ya to the cross-referencing personal prefixes.

Phonology

Consonants

Vowels 

/u/ can also range to [o].

Grammar 
Unmarked constituent order is AVO, VSo, SaV, or SioV.

Indirect objects tend to be placed immediately after the predicate.

References

Languages of Brazil
Languages of Venezuela
Arawakan languages